Warren Austin Sprout (February 3, 1874 – August 23, 1945) was an American sport shooter who competed in the 1912 Summer Olympics.

In 1912, he won the gold medal as member of the American team in the team military rifle competition as well as two bronze medals in the team 25 metre small-bore rifle event and in the team 50 metre small-bore rifle competition. In the 1912 Summer Olympics he also participated in the following events:

 50 metre rifle, prone - twelfth place
 600 metre free rifle - 14th place
 25 metre small-bore rifle - 17th place
 300 metre free rifle, three positions - 32nd place
 300 metre military rifle, three positions - 37th place

He was born in Picture Rocks, Pennsylvania and died in Westfield, New Jersey.

References

External links
profile

1874 births
1945 deaths
American male sport shooters
ISSF rifle shooters
Shooters at the 1912 Summer Olympics
Olympic gold medalists for the United States in shooting
Olympic bronze medalists for the United States in shooting
Medalists at the 1912 Summer Olympics